Taibaiella yonginensis is a Gram-negative, aerobic, rod-shaped and non-motile bacterium from the genus of Taibaiella which has been isolated from soil from Yongin city from Korea.

References

Chitinophagia
Bacteria described in 2015